Mitromica omanensis is a species of sea snail, a marine gastropod mollusk, in the family Costellariidae, the ribbed miters.

Description
The length of the shell attains 7.3 mm.

Distribution
This marine species occurs off Oman.

References

Costellariidae